Digital literacy is an individual's ability to find, evaluate, and communicate information by utilizing typing or digital media platforms. It is a combination of both technical and cognitive abilities in using information and communication technologies to create, evaluate, and share information.  

While digital literacy initially focused on digital skills and stand-alone computers, the advent of the internet and the use of social media has resulted in a shift in some of its focus to mobile devices. Similar to other evolving definitions of literacy that recognize the cultural and historical ways of making meaning, digital literacy does not replace traditional methods of interpreting information, but rather extends the foundational skills of these traditional literacies.  Digital literacy should be considered a part of the path towards acquiring knowledge.

History 
Digital literacy is built on the expanding role of social science research in the field of literacy as well as on concepts of visual literacy, computer literacy, and information literacy.

Digital literacy is often discussed in the context of its precursor, media literacy. Media literacy education began in the United Kingdom and the United States as a result of war propaganda in the 1930s and the rise of advertising in the 1960s, respectively. Manipulative messaging and the increase in various forms of media further concerned educators. Educators began to promote media literacy education to teach individuals how to judge and assess the media messages they were receiving. The ability to critique digital and media content allows individuals to identify biases and evaluate messages independently.

For individuals to evaluate digital and media messages independently, they must demonstrate digital and media literacy competence. Renee Hobbs developed a list of skills that demonstrate digital and media literacy competence. Digital and media literacy include the ability to examine and comprehend the meaning of messages, judge credibility, and assess the quality of a digital work. A digitally literate individual becomes a socially responsible member of their community by spreading awareness and helping others find digital solutions at home, work, or on a national platform.  Digital literacy doesn't just pertain to reading and writing on a digital device. It also involves knowledge of producing other forces of media, like recording and uploading video.

Overall, digital literacy shares many defining principles with other fields that use modifiers in front of literacy to define ways of being and domain-specific knowledge or competence. The term has grown in popularity in education and higher education settings and is used in both international and national standards.

Academic and pedagogical concepts
In academia, digital literacy is a part of the computing subject area alongside computer science and information technology.

Given the many varied implications that digital literacy has on students and educators, pedagogy has responded by emphasizing four specific models of engaging with digital mediums. Those four models are text-participating, code-breaking, text-analyzing, and text-using.  These methods present students (and other learners) with the ability to fully engage with the media, but also enhance the way the individual can relate to the digital text to their lived experiences.

21st-century skills 

Digital literacy requires certain skill sets that are interdisciplinary in nature. Warschauer and Matuchniak (2010) list three skill sets, or 21st century skills, that individuals need to master in order to be digitally literate: information, media, and technology; learning and innovation skills; and life and career skills..  Aviram et al. assert that order to be competent in Life and Career Skills, it is also necessary to be able to exercise flexibility and adaptability, initiative and self-direction, social and cross-cultural skills, productivity and accountability, leadership and responsibility. Digital literacy is composed of different literacies, because of this fact, there is no need to search for similarities and differences.  Some of these literacies are media literacy and information literacy.

Aviram & Eshet-Alkalai contend that five types of literacies are encompassed in the umbrella term that is digital literacy.

 Reproduction literacy: the ability to use digital technology to create a new piece of work or combine existing pieces of work to make it your own.
 Photo-visual literacy: the ability to read and deduce information from visuals. 
  Branching literacy: the ability to successfully navigate in the non-linear medium of digital space.
 Information literacy: the ability to search, locate, assess and critically evaluate information found on the web and on-shelf in libraries.
 Socio-emotional literacy: the social and emotional aspects of being present online, whether it may be through socializing, and collaborating, or simply consuming content.

In society 
Digital literacy is necessary for the correct use of various digital platforms. Literacy in social network services and Web 2.0 sites help people stay in contact with others, pass timely information, and even buy and sell goods and services. Digital literacy can also prevent people from being taken advantage of online, as photo manipulation, E-mail frauds and phishing often can fool the digitally illiterate, costing victims money and making them vulnerable to identity theft. However, those using technology and the internet to commit these manipulations and fraudulent acts possess the digital literacy abilities to fool victims by understanding the technical trends and consistencies; it becomes important to be digitally literate to always think one step ahead when utilizing the digital world.

The emergence of social media has paved the way for people to communicate and connect with one another in new and different ways. Websites like Facebook and Twitter, as well as personal websites and blogs, have enabled a new type of journalism that is subjective, personal, and "represents a global conversation that is connected through its community of readers." These online communities foster group interactivity among the digitally literate. Social media also help users establish a digital identity or a "symbolic digital representation of identity attributes."  Without digital literacy or the assistance of someone who is digitally literate, one cannot possess a personal digital identity (this is closely allied to web literacy).

Research has demonstrated that the differences in the level of digital literacy depend mainly on age and education level, while the influence of gender is decreasing. Among young people, digital literacy is high in its operational dimension. Young people rapidly move through hypertext and have a familiarity with different kinds of online resources. However, the skills to critically evaluate the content found online show a deficit. With the rise of digital connectivity amongst young people, concerns of digital safety are higher than ever. A study conducted in Poland, commissioned by the Ministry of National Knowledge measured the digital literacy of parents in regards to digital and online safety. It concluded that parents often overestimate their level of knowledge, but clearly had an influence on their children’s attitude and behavior towards the digital world. It suggests that with proper training programs parents should have the knowledge in teaching their children about the safety precautions necessary to navigate the digital space.

Digital divide 

Digital divide refers to the disparities among people - such as those living in developed and developing world - concerning access to and the use of information and communication technologies (ICT), particularly computer hardware, software, and the Internet. Individuals within societies that lack economic resources to build ICT infrastructure do not have adequate digital literacy, which means that their digital skills are limited. The divide can be explained by Max Weber's social stratification theory, which focuses on access to production rather ownership of the capital. The former becomes access to ICT so that an individual can accomplish interaction and produce information or create a product and that, without it, he or she cannot participate in the learning, collaboration, and production processes. Digital literacy and digital access have become increasingly important competitive differentiators for individuals using the internet meaningfully. In an article by Jen Schradie called, The Great Class Wedge and the Internet's Hidden Costs, she discusses how social class can affect digital literacy.  This creates a digital divide.

Research published in 2012 found that the digital divide, as defined by access to information technology, does not exist amongst youth in the United States. Young people report being connected to the internet at rates of 94-98%. There remains, however, a civic opportunity gap, where youth from poorer families and those attending lower socioeconomic status schools are less likely to have opportunities to apply their digital literacy. The digital divide is also defined as emphasizing the distinction between the “haves” and “have-nots,” and presented all data separately for rural, urban, and central-city categories.  Also, existing research on the digital divide reveals the existence of personal categorical inequalities between young and old people. An additional interpretation identified the gap between technology accessed by youth outside and inside the classroom.

Participation gap 
Media theorist Henry Jenkins coined the term participation gap and distinguished the participation gap from the digital divide. According to Jenkins, in countries like the United States, where nearly everyone has access to the internet, the concept of the digital divide does not provide enough insight.  As such, Jenkins uses the term participation gap to develop a more nuanced view of access to the internet. Instead of referring to the "have's" vs "have-nots" when referring to digital technologies, Jenkins proposes the participation gap refers to people who have sustained access to and competency with digital technologies due to media convergence. Jenkins states that students learn different sets of technology skills if they only have access to the internet in a library or school. In particular, Jenkins observes that students who have access to the internet at home have more opportunities to develop their skills and have fewer limitations, such as computer time limits and website filters commonly used in libraries. The participation gap is geared toward millennials. As of 2008, when this study was created they were the oldest generation to be born in the age of technology. As of 2008 more technology has been integrated into the classroom. The issue with digital literacy is that students have access to the internet at home which is equivalent to what they interact with in class. Some students only have access while at school and in a library. They aren't getting enough or the same quality of the digital experience. This creates the participation gap, along with an inability to understand digital literacy.

Digital rights 

Digital rights are an individual’s rights that allow them freedom of expression and opinion in an online setting, with roots centered on human theoretical and practical rights. It encompasses the individual’s privacy rights when using the Internet, and is essentially responsible for how an individual uses different technologies and how content is distributed and mediated. Government officials and policymakers use digital rights as a springboard for enacting and developing policies and laws in order to obtain rights online the same way we obtain rights in real life. Private organizations who possess their own online infrastructures also develop rights specific to their property. In today’s world, most, if not all materials have shifted into an online setting and public policy has had a major influence in supporting this movement. Going beyond traditional academics, ethical rights such as copyright, citizenship and conversation can be attributed to digital literacy because tools and materials nowadays can be easily copied, borrowed, stolen, and repurposed, as literacy is collaborative and interactive, especially in a networked world.

Digital citizenship 

Digital citizenship refers to the "right to participate in society online". It is connected to the notion of state-based citizenship which is determined by the country or region in which one was born as well as the idea of being a 'dutiful citizen who participates in the electoral process and online through mass media. A literate digital citizen possesses the skills to read, write and interact with online communities via screens and has an orientation for social justice. This is best described in the article Digital Citizenship during a Global Pandemic: Moving beyond Digital Literacy, "Critical digital civic literacy, as is the case of democratic citizenship more generally, requires moving from learning about citizenship to participating and engaging in democratic communities face‐to‐face, online, and in all the spaces in between." Through the various digital skills and literacy one gains, one is able to effectively solve social problems which might arise through social platforms. Additionally, digital citizenship has three online dimensions: higher wages, democratic participation, and better communication opportunities which arise from the digital skills acquired. Digital citizenship also refers to online awareness and the ability to be safe and responsible online. This idea came from the rise of social media in the past decade which has enhanced global connectivity and faster interaction. However, with this phenomenon, the existence of fake news, hate speeches, cyberbullying, hoaxes and so on has emerged as well.  Hence, this has created a codependent relationship between digital literacy and digital citizenship.

Digital natives and digital immigrants 

Marc Prensky invented and popularized the terms digital natives and digital immigrants to describe respectively an individual born into the digital age and one adopting the appropriate skills later in life. A digital immigrant refers to an individual who adopts technology later in life. These two groups of people have had different interactions with technology since birth, a generational gap. This directly links to their individual unique relationship with digital literacy. Digital natives brought upon the creation of ubiquitous information systems (UIS).  These systems include mobile phones, laptop computers and personal digital assistants.  They have also expanded to cars and buildings (smart cars and smart homes), creating a new unique technological experience.

Carr claims that digital immigrants, although they adapt to the same technology as natives, possess a sort of accent which restricts them from communicating the way natives do. Research shows that, due to the brain's malleable nature, technology has changed the way today's students read, perceive, and process information. Marc Prensky believes this is a problem because today's students have a vocabulary and skill set educators (who at the time of his writing would be digital immigrants) may not fully understand.

Statistics and popular representations of the elderly portray them as digital immigrants. For example, Canada 2010 found that 29% of its citizens were 75 years of age and older, and 60% of its citizens between the ages of 65-74 had browsed the internet in the past month. Conversely, internet activity reached almost 100% among its 15 through 24-year-old citizens.

Applications of digital literacy

In education 
Schools are continuously updating their curricula to keep up with accelerating technological developments. This often includes computers in the classroom, the use of educational software to teach curricula, and course materials being made available to students online. Students are often taught literacy skills such as how to verify credible sources online, cite websites, and prevent plagiarism. Google and Wikipedia are frequently used by students "for everyday life research," and are just two common tools that facilitate modern education.  Digital technology has impacted the way material is taught in the classroom. With the use of technology rising over the past decade, educators are altering traditional forms of teaching to include course material on concepts related to digital literacy. Educators have also turned to social media platforms to communicate and share ideas with one another. Social media and social networks have become a crucial part of the information landscape. Many students are using social media to share their areas of interest, which helps boost their level of engagement with educators.  New standards have been put into place as digital technology has augmented classrooms, with many classrooms being designed to use smartboards and audience response systems in replacement of traditional chalkboards or whiteboards. “The development of Teacher’s Digital Competence (TDC) should start in initial teacher training, and continue throughout the following years of practice. All this to use Digital Technologies (DT) to improve teaching and professional development.” New models of learning are being developed with digital literacy in mind. Several countries have based their models on the emphasis of finding new digital didactics to implement as they find more opportunities and trends through surveys conducted with educators and college instructors. Additionally, these new models of learning in the classroom have aided in promoting global connectivity and have enabled students to become globally-minded citizens. According to the study Building Digital Literacy Bridges Connecting Cultures and Promoting Global Citizenship in Elementary Schools through School-Based Virtual Field Trips by Stacy Delacruz, Virtual Field Trips (VFT) a new form of multimedia presentation has gained popularity over the years in that they offer the "opportunity for students to visit other places, talk to experts and participate in interactive learning activities without leaving the classroom". They have also been used as a vessel for supporting cross-cultural collaboration amongst schools which includes: "improved language skills, greater classroom engagement, deeper understandings of issues from multiple perspectives, and an increased sensitivity to multicultural differences". It also allows students to be the creators of their own digital content, a core standard from The International Society for Technology in Education (ISTE).

The COVID-19 virus that started in late 2019 had spread to over multiple countries within months, forcing the World Health Organization to declare an international public health emergency and a pandemic. The outbreak  pushed education into a more digital and online experience where teachers had to adopt to new levels of digital competencies in software to continue the education system  as academic institutions discontinued all in-person activity and  different online meeting platforms are being used for better communications (e.g: Skype, Zoom, Cisco Webex, Google Hangouts, Microsoft Teams, BlueJeans and Slack).  Two major formats of online learnings: Asynchronous allow students to have more collaborative space and build up involvement. Synchronous learnings mostly take on live video format for better. An estimated 84% of the global student body was affected by this sudden closure due to the pandemic.  Because of this sudden transition, there had been a clear disparity in student and school preparedness for digital education due in large part to a divide in digital skills and literacy that both the students and educators experience.  For example, countries like Croatia had begun work on digitalizing its schools through countrywide digitalization efforts (in this case managed by the Croatian National Research and Education Network). In a pilot initiative, 920 instructors and over 6 000 pupils from 151 schools received computers, tablets, and presentation equipment, as well as improved connection and teacher training. When the pandemic struck, pilot schools were ready to begin offering online programs within two days.

The switch to online learning has also brought about some concerns regarding learning effectiveness, exposure to cyber-risks and lack of socialization, prompting the need to implement changes to how students are able to learn much needed digital skills and develop digital literacy.  As a response, the DQ (Digital Intelligence) Institute, designed a common framework for enhancing digital literacy, digital skills and digital readiness. Attention and focus was also brought on the development of digital literacy on higher education. An interesting fact discovered through the process of digital learning is those who were born as Generation Z (born between the years 1996 and 2000) are "natural skills of digital native learners". These young adults tend to have a higher acceptability on digital learning.

A study in Spain measured the digital knowledge of 4883 teachers of all education levels over the last school years and found that their digital skills required further training to advance new learning models for the digital age. Training programs have been proposed favoring the joint framework of INTEF (Spanish acronym for National Institute of Educational Technologies and Teacher Training) as reference. Surveys taken in Spain, Italy and Ecuador asking questions related to local student's online learning experience, 86.16% of students in Italy said they felt less accommodated, following with 68.8% in Italy, and 17.39% in Ecuador.

In Europe, the Digital Competence of Educators (DigCompEdu) developed a framework to address and promote the development of digital literacy. It is divided into six branches (professional engagement, digital sources resources, teaching and learning, assessment, empowering learners & facilitating learners’ digital competence). Moreover, the European Commission also developed the Digital Education Action Plan (2021-2027) which focuses on using the COVID-19 pandemic experience as a learning point, when technology is being used at a large scale for education, and being able to adapt the systems used for leaning and training towards the digital age. The framework is divided into two main strategic priorities: fostering the development of a high-performing digital education ecosystem and enhancing digital skills and competences for the digital transformation.

Digital competences
In 2013 the Open Universiteit Nederland release an article defining twelve digital competence areas. These areas are based on the knowledge and skills people have to acquire to be a literate person.

 A.	General knowledge and functional skills. Knowing the basics of digital devices and using them for elementary purposes.
 B.	Use in everyday life. Being able to integrate digital technologies into the activities in everyday life.
 C.	Specialized and advanced competence for work and creative expression. Being able to use ICT to express your creativity and improve your professional performance.
 D.	Technology mediated communication and collaboration. Being able to connect, share, communicate, and collaborate with others effectively in a digital environment.
 E.	Information processing and management. Using technology to improve your ability to gather, analyze and judge the relevance and purpose of digital information.
 F.	Privacy and security. Being able to protect your privacy and take appropriate security measures.
 G.	Legal and ethical aspects. Behaving appropriately and in a socially responsible way in the digital environment and being aware of the legal and ethical aspects of the use of ICT.
 H.	Balanced attitude towards technology. Demonstrating an informed, open-minded, and balanced attitude towards information society and the use of digital technologies.
 I.	Understanding and awareness of the role of ICT in society. Understanding the broader context of use and development of ICT.
 J.	Learning about and with digital technologies. Exploring emerging technologies and integrating them.
 K.	Informed decisions on appropriate digital technologies. Being aware of the most relevant or common technologies.
 L.	Seamless use demonstrating self-efficacy. Confidently and creatively applying digital technologies to increase personal and professional effectiveness and efficiency.

The competencies mentioned are based on each other. Competencies A, B, and C are the basic knowledge and skills a person has to have to be a fully digital literate person. When these three competencies are acquired you can build upon this knowledge and those skills to build the other competencies.

Digital writing
University of Southern Mississippi professor, Dr Suzanne Mckee-Waddell  conceptualized the idea of digital composition as the ability to integrate multiple forms of communication technologies and research to create a better understanding of a topic. Digital writing is a pedagogy being taught increasingly in universities. It is focused on the impact technology has had on various writing environments; it is not simply the process of using a computer to write.  Educators in favour of digital writing argue that it is necessary because "technology fundamentally changes how writing is produced, delivered, and received." The goal of teaching digital writing is that students will increase their ability to produce a relevant, high-quality product, instead of just a standard academic paper.

One aspect of digital writing is the use of hypertext or LaTeX. As opposed to printed text, hypertext invites readers to explore information in a non-linear fashion. Hypertext consists of traditional text and hyperlinks that send readers to other texts. These links may refer to related terms or concepts (such is the case on Wikipedia), or they may enable readers to choose the order in which they read. The process of digital writing requires the composer to make unique "decisions regarding linking and omission." These decisions "give rise to questions about the author's responsibilities to the [text] and objectivity."

In the workforce
The 2014 Workforce Innovation and Opportunity Act (WIOA) defines digital literacy skills as a workforce preparation activity. In the modern world employees are expected to be digitally literate, having full digital competence. Those who are digitally literate are more likely to be economically secure, as many jobs require a working knowledge of computers and the Internet to perform basic tasks. Additionally, digital technologies such as mobile devices, production suites and collaboration platforms are ubiquitous in most office workplaces and are often crucial in daily tasks as many White collar jobs today are performed primarily using said devices and technology. Many of these jobs require proof of digital literacy to be hired or promoted. Sometimes companies will administer their tests to employees, or official certification will be required. A study on the role of digital literacy in the EU labour market found that individuals are more likely to be employed the more digitally literate they are.

As technology has become cheaper and more readily available, more blue-collar jobs have required digital literacy as well. Manufacturers and retailers, for example, are expected to collect and analyze data about productivity and market trends to stay competitive. Construction workers often use computers to increase employee safety.

In entrepreneurship 
The acquisition of digital literacy is also important when it comes to starting and growing new ventures. The emergence of World Wide Web and digital platforms has led to a plethora of new digital products or services that can be bought and sold. Entrepreneurs are at the forefront of this development, using digital tools or infrastructure to deliver physical products, digital artifacts, or Internet-enabled service innovations. Research has shown that digital literacy for entrepreneurs consists of four levels (basic usage, application, development, and transformation) and three dimensions (cognitive, social, and technical). At the lowest level, entrepreneurs need to be able to use access devices as well as basic communication technologies to balance safety and information needs. As they move to higher levels of digital literacy, entrepreneurs will be able to master and manipulate more complex digital technologies and tools, enhancing the absorptive capacity and innovative capability of their venture. In a similar vein, if Small to Medium Enterprises(SME's) possess the ability to adapt to dynamic shifts in technology, then they can take advantage of trends, marketing campaigns as well as communication to consumers in order to generate more demand for their goods and services. Moreover, if entrepreneurs are digitally literate, then online platforms like social media can further help businesses receive feedback and generate community engagement that could potentially boost their business's performance as well as their brand image. A research paper published in The Journal of Asian Finance, Economics and Business provides critical insight that suggests digital literacy has the greatest influence on the performance of SME entrepreneurs.  The authors suggest their findings can help craft performance development strategies for said SME entrepreneurs and argue their research shows the essential contribution of digital literacy in developing business and marketing networks. Additionally, the study found digitally literate entrepreneurs are able to communicate and reach wider markets than non-digitally literate entrepreneurs because of the use web-management and e-commerce platforms supported by data analysis and coding.  That said, constraints do exist for SME's to use e-commerce.  Some of these constraints include lack of technical understanding of information technologies, high cost of internet access (especially for those in rural/underdeveloped areas), and other constraints.

Global impact
The United Nations included digital literacy in its 2030 Sustainable Development Goals, under thematic indicator 4.4.2, which encourages the development of digital literacy proficiency in teens and adults to facilitate educational and professional opportunities and growth. International initiatives like the Global Digital Literacy Council (GDLC) and the Coalition for Digital Intelligence (CDI) have also highlighted the need for, and strategies to address, digital literacy on a global scale. The CDI, under the umbrella of the DQ Institute, created a Common Framework for Digital Literacy, Skills, and Readiness in 2019 that conceptualizes eight areas of digital life (identity, use, safety, security, emotional intelligence, communication, literacy, and rights), three levels of maturity (citizenship, creativity, and competitiveness), and three components of competency (knowledge, attitudes and values, and skills; or, what, why, and how). The UNESCO Institute for Statistics (UIS) also works to create, gather, map, and assess common frameworks on digital literacy across multiple member states around the world.

In an attempt to narrow the Digital Divide, on September 26, 2018, the United States Senate Foreign Relations Committee passed legislation to help provide access to the internet in developing countries via the H.R.600 Digital Global Access Policy Act. The legislation itself was based on Senator Ed Markey's Digital Age Act, which was first introduced to the senate in 2016. In addition, Senator Markey provided a statement after the act was passed through the Senate: “American ingenuity created the internet and American leadership should help bring its power to the developing world,” said Senator Markey. “Bridging the global digital divide can help promote prosperity, strengthen democracy, expand educational opportunity and lift some of the world’s poorest and most vulnerable out of poverty. The Digital GAP Act is a passport to the 21st-century digital economy, linking the people of the developing world to the most successful communications and commerce tool in history. I look forward to working with my colleagues to get this legislation signed into law and to harness the power of the internet to help the developing world."

The Philippines' Education Secretary Jesli Lapus has emphasized the importance of digital literacy in Filipino education. He claims a resistance to change is the main obstacle to improving the nation's education in the globalized world. In 2008, Lapus was inducted into Certiport's "Champions of Digital Literacy" Hall of Fame for his work emphasizing digital literacy.

A study done in 2011 by the Southern African Linguistics & Applied Language Studies program observed some South African university students regarding digital literacy. It was found that while their courses did require some sort of digital literacy, very few students actually had access to a computer. Many had to pay others to type any work, as their digital literacy was almost nonexistent. Findings show that class, ignorance, and inexperience still affect any access to learning South African university students may need.

See also
 Computer literacy
 Cyber self-defense
 Data literacy
 Information literacies
 Web literacy
Media literacy
Digital intelligence
Digital rhetoric
Digital rights
Digital citizen

References

Bibliography
 Vuorikari, R., Punie, Y., Gomez, S. C., & Van Den Brande, G. (2016). DigComp 2.0: The Digital Competence Framework for Citizens. Update Phase 1: The Conceptual Reference Model (No. JRC101254). Institute for Prospective Technological Studies, Joint Research Centre. https://ec.europa.eu/jrc/en/digcomp and https://ec.europa.eu/jrc/en/publication/eur-scientific-and-technical-research-reports/digcomp-20-digital-competence-framework-citizens-update-phase-1-conceptual-reference-model

External links

 digitalliteracy.gov An initiative of the Obama Administration to serve as a valuable resource to practitioners who are delivering digital literacy training and services in their communities.
 digitalliteracy.org A Clearinghouse of Digital Literacy and Digital Inclusion best practices from around the world.
 DigitalLiteracy.us A reference guide for public educators on the topic of digital literacy.

Digital divide
Literacy